Heart Like a Grave is the eighth studio album by Finnish melodic death metal band Insomnium, released on 4 October 2019 via Century Media. It is the first album to feature guitarist Jani Liimatainen. Loudwire named it one of the 50 best metal albums of 2019.

Track listing

Personnel
Credits are adapted from the album liner notes.

Insomnium
 Niilo Sevänen – bass, lead vocals
 Ville Friman – guitars, clean vocals
 Markus Vanhala – guitars
 Jani Liimatainen – guitars, clean vocals
 Markus Hirvonen – drums

Additional musician
 Teemu Aalto – backing vocals

Arrangements
 Insomnium – arrangements
 Teemu Aalto – arrangements
 Aleksi Munter – keyboards arrangements

Production and design
 Insomnium – production
 Teemu Aalto – production, recording , mixing , mastering 
 Kimmo Perkkiö – recording 
 Aleksi Munter – recording 
 Jens Bogren – mixing, mastering
 Simo Heikkinen – artwork
 Vesa Ranta – artwork, photography 
 Nora Dirkling – layout
 Jussi Ratilainen – photography

Charts

References

External links
 
 Heart Like a Grave  at Century Media Records

2019 albums
Century Media Records albums
Insomnium albums